Ein verrücktes Paar (A crazy couple) is a German TV comedy sketch show series, broadcast on ZDF between 1977 and 1980.

See also
List of German television series

External links
 

1977 German television series debuts
1980 German television series endings
German comedy television series
German-language television shows
ZDF original programming